Astragalus nevinii is a rare species of milkvetch known by the common name San Clemente Island milkvetch. It is endemic to San Clemente Island, one of the Channel Islands of California. It is coated in woolly, tangled hairs.

External links
Jepson Manual Treatment
USDA Plants Profile

nevinii
Endemic flora of California
Flora without expected TNC conservation status